Farsia is a monotypic snout moth genus described by Hans Georg Amsel in 1961. Its only species, Farsia pallorella, described by the same author, is found in Iran.

References

Moths described in 1961
Phycitinae
Moths of Asia
Monotypic moth genera